Dominggus Mandacan is an Indonesian politician and the former Governor of West Papua from 2017 to 2022.

Surabaya Mayor Tri Rismaharini traveled to the province to help campaign for Mandacan and his running mate, Mohammad Lakotani, and the Mandacan-Lakotani ticket had the support of both the Indonesian Democratic Party of Struggle and the Nasdem Party.

He was the son of Lodewijk Mandatjan, the leader of Arfak tribe, and alongside Barents Mandatjan, were early figures of Indonesian Nationalist in Papua who was involved in red-white flag raising ceremony in Borarsi, Manokwari, before switching side to support Papuan Independence. During 1963-1969, He alongside Permenas Ferry Awom, former member of PVK, lead a group of early OPM waged a guerrilla warfare against Indonesian forces. These events were collectively known as Arfai incident. He surrendered and switch to Indonesian side, and receive titular military title of Major from Indonesian Army. A police hospital, RS Bhayangkara Polda Papua Barat, was also named after him.

References

1959 births
Living people
People from Manokwari
Papuan people
Indonesian Christians
Nasdem Party politicians
Governors of West Papua (province)